Jean Rodier (4 July 1891 – 10 May 1965) was a French water polo player. He competed in the men's tournament at the 1912 Summer Olympics.

References

External links
 

1891 births
1965 deaths
French male water polo players
Olympic water polo players of France
Water polo players at the 1912 Summer Olympics
Water polo players from Paris